Boueilh-Boueilho-Lasque is a commune in the Pyrénées-Atlantiques department in southwestern France.

See also
Communes of the Pyrénées-Atlantiques department

References

Communes of Pyrénées-Atlantiques
Pyrénées-Atlantiques communes articles needing translation from French Wikipedia